Patrick Kerr (born January 23, 1956) is an American film and television actor, known for his recurring role as Noel Shempsky on Frasier.

Career 
He has appeared on Curb Your Enthusiasm as a blind pianist and acquaintance of Larry, on ER as a patient who was attacked by a group of schoolgirls after he flashed them, and on Seinfeld as a New York Yankees employee whom George causes to break down. Other television appearances in Kerr's repertoire are on Law & Order, The Drew Carey Show, 3rd Rock from the Sun, Will & Grace, Friends and the Friends spin-off Joey. He also appeared in the Disney Channel's series Jessie as "Clement Brulee".

He starred in the 1993 Off-Broadway Paul Rudnick play Jeffrey. His Broadway debut was in the 2014 remake of You Can't Take It With You as Mr DePinna the fireworks expert. His costar was James Earl Jones among others.

He is also active on the American stage, appearing in productions at California Shakespeare Theater, South Coast Repertory, and Berkeley Rep, among others. In 2007, he appeared in the short films Random Acts of Kindness, Die Hardly Working, Anklebiters, Girl Trouble, Goldfish, Time Upon A Once, and The Losers which were produced during the reality show On the Lot.

He starred as Zazu in Disney's The Lion King at Mandalay Bay in Las Vegas until its closure.

Filmography

Film

Television

References

External links

1956 births
Living people
American male television actors
Male actors from Wilmington, Delaware
American male stage actors
Yale School of Drama alumni